Aniyathipraavu is an Indian Malayalam-language soap opera. The show premiered on 25 April 2022 on Surya TV and streams on-demand through Sun NXT. It stars Deva Prasad and Deepika Aradhya in lead roles along with R. Vishwa, Noobin Johny and Nazila Nazarudeen in pivotal roles. It is an official remake of Tamil soap opera Vanathai Pola.

Synopsis
The story revolves around siblings Sreekanth and Sreelakshmi. After their parents' death, Sreekanth and Sreelakshmi were raised by their grandmother. Sreekanth is on the lookout for a suitable groom for Sreelakshmi. However, she repeatedly rejects the potential grooms as she doesn't want to leave her brother. As fate would have it, she falls in love with Sreekanth's nemesis, Rohit. Sreekanth and Sreelakshmi's cousin, Renjith, who is interested in Sreelakshmi will go to any lengths to marry her.

Cast

Main
Deva Prasad as Sreekanth: Panchayath President of Thonnoorkara village;  Sreelakshmi's elder brother.
Deepika Aradhya / Julie Hendry as Sreelakshmi: Sreekanth's younger sister; Renjith's wife.

Recurring
R. Vishwa as Renjith Somarajan: Somarajan and Ambika's son; Sreekanth and Sreelakshmi's cousin; Sreelakshmi's husband. 
Avinash Ashok / Kiran Iyer / Noobin Johny as Rohit: A bank manager; Sreelakshmi's former love interest.
Sivakami Kaimal / Nazila Nazarudeen as Architha: A thahsildar; Sreekanth's love interest. 
Deepa Jayan / Riya Thomas as Sithara: Mohandas and Shobha's daughter; Sreekanth and Sreelakshmi's cousin.
Sreekala V.K as Padmavathiyamma: Ambika and Mohandas's mother; Sreekanth, Sreelakshmi, Renjith and Sithara's grandmother. 
Kottayam Rasheed as Somarajan: Renjith's father.
Soumya Sreekumar / Sangeetha Rajendran as Ambika: Renjith's mother.
Venugopal / Manu Varma / Rudraprathap as Mohandas: Sithara's father. 
Yamuna as Shobha: Sithara's mother.
Abhilash / Prajeesh as Manikuttan 
Vinayak as Akshay: Sreelakshmi's ex-fiancee.
Divya Sreedhar as Kamala: Somarajan's sister
Arjun Syam as Lechu's friend
Resh Lakshna as Poornima
Resmi Rahul

Guest 
 Mallika Sukumaran ad Herself (2023)
 Reneesha Rahiman as Herself (2022,2023)
 Jay Prakash as Herself (2022)
 Anna Dona as Herself (2022)
 Krishnakumar Nair as Herself (2022)
 Mariya Shilji as Herself (2022)

Adaptations

References

External links
 Official website 

Indian drama television series
Indian television soap operas
Indian television series
Malayalam-language television shows
2022 Indian television series debuts
Surya TV original programming
Malayalam-language television series based on Tamil-language television series